The Crazy Kids of the War is a 1967 Italian-French "musicarello" film directed by Steno.

Cast 

 Rita Pavone: Rita 
 Terence Hill: Professor Giuliano Fineschi 
 Francis Blanche: Captain Hans Vogel 
 Aroldo Tieri: Major Kurt von Braun 
 Jess Hahn: Major Peter Hawkins 
 Teddy Reno: Father Sevatino 
 Michel Modo: Fritz, Vogel's Assistant 
 Giampiero Littera: Michele 
 Giovanni Cianfriglia: German soldier

See also
 List of Italian films of 1967

References

External links

1967 films
French musical comedy films
Musicarelli
Films directed by Stefano Vanzina
1967 musical comedy films
Films scored by Berto Pisano
1960s Italian films
1960s French films
Italian-language French films